Samir Abi Rashed (in Arabic ), born in Beirut in 1947, is a Lebanese painter. His work is representative of the influence of surrealism on middle eastern painters and expresses, with a careful and almost "photographic" technical execution, an erotic unconscious world of dreams and symbols.

Bibliography
The artist has passed away 29.11.21

References

External links
 Works by Samir Abi Rashed

Lebanese painters
Artists from Beirut
1947 births
Living people